Laurence Minot (1300? – 1352?) was an English poet. Nothing definite is known of him. It has been suggested that he was a cousin of Thomas Minot, Archbishop of Dublin 1363-75. If this is so, he came from a family from the north of England. He may have been a soldier. Eleven poems are attributed to him, all of which appear uniquely in Cotton MS Galba E IX in the British Library Department of Manuscripts, London. In them, he celebrates in northern English and with a somewhat ferocious patriotism the victories of Edward III over the Scots and the French.

References

External links

Laurence Minot, Joseph Hall (editor). The Poems of Minot. Oxford : Clarendon Press, 1914.
Laurence Minot, Richard H. Osberg (editor). The Poems of Laurence Minot 1332-1352, Kalamazoo, Michigan: Medieval Institute Publications, 1997.
Medium Ævum on-line entry on Minot by Joanna Bellis.

1300 births
1352 deaths
14th-century English poets
English male poets